Bonnacois may refer to:
Bonnac, Ariège inhabitants
Bonnac-la-Côte inhabitants